Rob Hennigar (born April 4, 1983) is a former Canadian professional ice hockey player.
Rob currently serves as Associate Head coach with the UNB Varsity Reds. Rob is a former player with UNB having played 4 seasons from 2004-05 to 2007-08.

UNB Notes
Rob left UNB having set the record for Career Points (212 - first player to eclipse 200), Most Assist (156), Most Points in the Post Season (35). Rob is also a First-Team member of UNB's Triple-Century Club having eclipsed 100 games (108), 100 assists (131) & 100 points (177) in regular season play alone.

Rob was a member of the CIS Men's Hockey team, composed solely of players from the AUS, that represented Canada at the 2007 FISU Winter Universiade in Turin, Italy. Team Canada won gold with a 3-1 victory over Russia (Rob scored the first and third goals for Team Canada).

Rob won a CIS University Cup with UNB in 2007.

Rob was selected as a 'First Team' UNB All-Decade team member for the 2000s as part of UNB's Hosting of the 50th CIS University Cup.

Awards and honours

References

External links

1983 births
Albany River Rats players
Bridgeport Sound Tigers players
Canadian ice hockey centres
Florida Everblades players
Living people
Utah Grizzlies (AHL) players
Victoria Salmon Kings players
Windsor Spitfires players